(English translation: "Intimate voices" or "Inner voices"), Op. 56, is a five-movement string quartet written in 1909 by the Finnish composer Jean Sibelius. He composed the work in D minor. It is the only major work for string quartet of his mature period.

History 
As a student, Sibelius composed several works for string quartet. In 1885 he finished a string quartet in E-flat major, followed in 1889, after quite a few individual movements for this combination, by a string quartet in A minor. The first string quartet to receive an opus number was in 1890 the quartet Op. 4 in B-flat major. Afterwards he wrote no string quartets until  in 1909. Composed between his Third and Fourth Symphony, it remained "the only major work for string quartet of Sibelius's mature period".

Sibelius composed the quartet from December 1908, working on it in London in early 1909. The Latin title, translating to "Intimate Voices" or "Inner voices", marks a "conversational quality" and "inwardness" of the music. The composer wrote about his work in a letter to his wife: "It turned out as something wonderful. The kind of thing that brings a smile to your lips at the hour of death. I will say no more." Sibelius showed it to his publisher Robert Lienau on 15 April 1909.

The first performance was on 25 April 1910 at the Helsinki Music Institute. A review in the Helsingin Sanomat noted: "The composition attracted a great deal of attention, and it is undoubtedly one of the most brilliant products in its field. It is not a composition for the public at large, it is so eccentric and out of the ordinary." Sibelius later wrote about the composition: "The melodic material is good but the harmonic material could be 'lighter', and even 'more like a quartet.'"

Structure and music 

Sibelius structured the quartet in five movements:

The work opens with a dialogue of violin and cello. The first movement contrasts "murmurous figuration with firm chords". The second movement is a scherzo in A major, connected to the first by musical motifs. The central slow movement has been described as a "soulful quest for serenity in F major". It contains "three detached, soft chords in E minor, remote from any of the previous harmonic implications", to which Sibelius added the "" in a friend's score. A second scherzo is also connected by motivic similarity to the first movement. The finale, "with more than a hint of folk fiddling", grows in intensity by markings from Allegro to "sempre più energico" (always more energetic), described as "fiercely accented music of forceful contrasts but irresistible momentum".

Arrangements
The Finnish violinist and composer Pekka Kuusisto has arranged the work for chamber orchestra, which was included in Kuusisto's 2009 Australian tour with the Australian Chamber Orchestra.

Literature 
 Beat Föllmi (ed.): Das Streichquartett in der ersten Hälfte des 20. Jahrhunderts (German), Verlag Hans Schneider, Tutzing 2004
 Tomi Mäkelä: Jean Sibelius und seine Zeit (German), Laaber-Verlag, Regensburg 2013
 Ulrich Wilker: "Ein fernes Murmeln aus einer fernen Welt". Zu Jean Sibelius’ Streichquartett "Voces intimae" d-Moll op. 56 (German), in: Stefan Börnchen/Claudia Liebrand (eds.): Lauschen und Überhören. Literarische und mediale Aspekte auditiver Offenheit, Wilhelm Fink Verlag, Paderborn 2020, p .193–211

References

External links 
 
 Jean Sibelius / String Quartet in D minor ("Voces Intimae"), Op. 56 AllMusic
 Jean Sibelius (1865–1957) / String Quartet in d minor, Op. 56, Voces intimae (Intimate Voices) earsense.org

Compositions for string quartet
Compositions by Jean Sibelius
Chamber music by Jean Sibelius
1909 compositions